The San Antonio Texas Temple is the 120th operating temple of the Church of Jesus Christ of Latter-day Saints (LDS Church).

History
On June 24, 2001 the LDS Church announced it would build a temple in San Antonio, Texas, making it the state's fourth. Within ten years, the number of church members in the area grew from 9,000 to 12,000. Until the San Antonio Texas Temple was completed, Latter-day Saints in the area travelled  to reach the nearest temple, near Houston.

On March 29, 2003 a site dedication and groundbreaking ceremony initiated construction. As the temple neared completion in September 2004, a ceremony was held to place a thirteen-foot, gold leafed angel Moroni statue on the spire of the temple.

After the building's completion, an open house was held April 16 through May 7, 2005 to allow people to see the inside of the temple. During these three weeks, more than 50,000 people took a tour through the newly finished temple. The inside of the temple is aesthetically furnished with African Cherrywood, stained glass windows, paintings of Jesus' life and a mural by San Antonio artist Keith Bond. The use of color in the stained glass windows, in a slightly muted southwest style, and the indigo and star motif inside the central spire sets this edifice apart from most all other LDS temples.

LDS Church president Gordon B. Hinckley dedicated the San Antonio Temple on May 22, 2005. A celebration was held at the Alamodome the night before the dedication. More than 20,000 people attended to watch a show featuring over 4,000 singers and dancers, horses, fireworks, and presentations of Texas history, family values, and Latter-day Saint beliefs. Hinckley spoke to those in attendance about the temple.

The San Antonio Texas Temple serves about 45,250 members living in an area spanning from Killeen to Brownsville.

In 2020, the San Antonio Texas Temple was closed in response to the coronavirus pandemic.

Gallery

See also

 Comparison of temples of The Church of Jesus Christ of Latter-day Saints
 List of temples of The Church of Jesus Christ of Latter-day Saints
 List of temples of The Church of Jesus Christ of Latter-day Saints by geographic region
 Temple architecture (Latter-day Saints)
 The Church of Jesus Christ of Latter-day Saints in Texas

References

External links
 San Antonio Temple Official site
 San Antonio Texas Temple at ChurchofJesusChristTemples.org

21st-century Latter Day Saint temples
Religious buildings and structures in San Antonio
Religious buildings and structures completed in 2005
Temples (LDS Church) in Texas
2005 establishments in Texas